GrandPa's or GrandPa Pidgeon's was a discount store founded in 1954 by Tom and Mildred Pidgeon, spreading across the midwest from its Bridgeton, Missouri (located in St. Louis County) origins, which remained truly "discount", when most others like Venture, Kmart and Target gradually raised prices in order to finance a more attractive layout and broader range of merchandise. Tom Pidgeon, born in Sebring, Ohio in 1902, was in the  low price china business from the early 1930s to the early 1950s. He sold his company, Pidgeon Vitrified China in 1953 when he foresaw the impact  plastic was having on the lower end dinnerware market. The first Grandpa Pidgeon's was opened in February 1954 and managed by his son-in-law, John (Jack) Holley, born in 1924 in Galena, Kansas.
In 1958 Jack Holley began a separate but related enterprise known as Grandpa's, and opened a store on Collinsville Road between East St. Louis and Collinsville, Illinois. Also another location in Swansea on Highway 159 which later became value city and is now currently Rural King.  Over the next decade, Holley subsequently opened several other stores in the St. Louis metropolitan area, before buying the company outright from his father-in-law in 1968.

Holley formed the Gramex Corporation in 1970, which also oversaw such companies as Forsythe Computers and Omni Sports, which was forced to close due to increasing competition.

In 1986 Jack Holley retired and turned the company over to his oldest son Tom Holley, who presided over an expansion both within and outside the metro St. Louis area into locations such as Greenville, Illinois and Farmington, Missouri, among other places. By the late 1990s there were thirteen Grandpa's locations.

GrandPa's was sold, in 1999, to Value City. It had approximately $200,000,000 in sales in its final year. It was profitable until its sale, failing to end only 1993 in the black, but was said to be facing a harder struggle near the end.

The company was known for their newspaper distributed advertising circulars that were printed mostly with black ink on a brown paper, in contrast to the glossy full color circulars of competitors.

See also
Deal$, chain of discount stores founded by Tom Holley in St. Louis, later sold
Jack Murdock (actor), portrayed Grandpa Pidgeon in television advertisements

Defunct discount stores of the United States
Companies based in Missouri
Companies based in St. Louis
Retail companies disestablished in 1999
Defunct companies based in Missouri
American companies established in 1954
Retail companies established in 1954  
1954 establishments in Missouri
1999 disestablishments in Missouri